Ripiceni is a commune in Botoșani County, Western Moldavia, Romania. It is composed of seven villages: Cinghiniia, Lehnești, Movila Ruptă, Popoaia, Râșca, Ripiceni and Ripicenii Vechi. It lies along the river Prut that forms the border with Moldova.

References

Ripiceni
Localities in Western Moldavia
Populated places on the Prut